The Afghan Youth Orchestra is a youth orchestra based in Afghanistan. It was founded by the Afghanistan National Institute of Music under the Ministry of Education. In 2013, the orchestra travelled to Carnegie Hall to perform for an American audience with the aim of spreading peace.

See also 
 List of youth orchestras

References

External links
Official website

National youth orchestras
Youth organisations based in Afghanistan
Afghan orchestras